Dutch Bros Inc. is a publicly held drive-through coffee chain in the United States. Founded by Dane and Travis Boersma, it is headquartered in Grants Pass, Oregon, with company-owned and franchise locations primarily located in the western United States although the company has begun to expand as far east as Sevierville, TN in the early 2020s.

History

Early history 

Dutch Bros was founded on February 12, 1992, by Dane and Travis Boersma, brothers of Dutch descent, in Grants Pass, Oregon. Their family's third-generation dairy farm had been struggling due to changes in environmental regulations, and the brothers were looking to start a new business. Travis Boersma suggested a coffee cart where they could sell espresso. Dane Boersma was able to help finance the idea with money he had set aside while running a Dairy Queen franchise. They spent an initial $12,000 on an espresso machine and a single pushcart, which they set up in downtown Grants Pass. The name Dutch Bros was chosen in honor of their immigrant grandparents.

They soon added four more carts, and by 1994 had established their first drive-through location. In 1996, the company began roasting its own coffee, sourcing beans from El Salvador, Colombia, and Brazil.

Expansion 

In 1994,  Dane and Travis Boersma struck a deal with a customer, Marty McKenna, which allowed him to open his own Dutch Bros in Medford, about 30 miles away from Grants Pass. McKenna's first stand performed so well that he soon opened up a second one across town. In 1997, the Boersmas brought McKenna on as partner, hoping he would continue to expand the Medford operations. Two years later, they bought out McKenna's stake in the company.

In 1999, Dutch Bros started formally franchising. The company opened its 50th franchised drive-thru location in 2004. That same year, shortly after moving into a new headquarters in Grants Pass, a nearby dumpster fire spread to the building, destroying Dutch Bros roasting equipment, five vehicles, and thousands of pounds of coffee beans. Following this incident, the company continued to expand, and by the end of 2004, operated 61 coffee shops spanning from Northern California to Oregon's Willamette Valley.

By 2009, Dutch Bros was running approximately 135 coffee stands in seven states and generating $50 million in gross annual revenue. Travis Boersma was featured on the American version of the television show Undercover Boss in 2013. Revenues continued to grow into the mid-2010s. The company made $238 million in systemwide sales in 2015, $350 million in 2016, and $415.3 million in 2017, by which point there were over 283 Dutch Bros locations.

In January 2017, Dutch Bros purchased a vacant shopping center in downtown Grants Pass where their original push cart was located. The company converted 20,000 square feet of the shopping center's interior into futsal courts for local youth soccer teams and workout space for its employees. In March of that same year, the company bought the Washington Federal bank building across the street from the shopping center, with the intention to move its headquarters and 150 employees into the bank building the following fall.

Capital increase and IPO 

In October 2018, Dutch Bros received an undisclosed amount from private equity firm TSG Consumer Partners for a minority stake in the company and announced plans to expand to 800 stores over the next five years.

Dutch Bros reported revenues of $238 million in 2019, $327.4 million in 2020, and $228 million over the first six months of 2021, heading into the company formally filing for its IPO in August 2021. The company stated in its filing that it hoped to raise $100 million, which it would use toward paying down $192 million in long-term debt. Dutch Bros held its IPO and began trading on the New York Stock Exchange with the ticker symbol "BROS" on September 15, 2021. The IPO raised $484 million, selling about 21 million shares for $23 each. Travis Boersma retained about 74 percent of shareholder voting power after the listing, due to his ownership of Class B stock.

Business model 

Dutch Bros operates as a chain. The vast majority of its stores are drive-thru stands. Each store sells hot and cold drinks, including non-coffee options, and a selection of baked goods.

The company started franchising in 1999. In 2008, Dutch Bros transitioned to an internal franchising model that required potential franchisees to have worked for the company for a minimum of three years. This resulted in a 97 percent continuity rate among franchises; between 2010 and 2015, only three percent of all Dutch Bros franchise locations closed. In 2017, Dutch Bros stopped franchising and started opening only company-owned stores. As of June 2021, 264 Dutch Bros stores were being run by franchisees and another 207 were fully company-owned. The company has a history of buying out franchisees who fall short of the company's customer service standards.

Operations 

Dutch Bros is headquartered in Grants Pass, Oregon. It is majority-owned by Travis Boersma, who holds the title of executive chairman, and Joth Ricci is its president and CEO. The company operates approximately 500 stores across 12 states and employs about 16,500 people. In September 2021, Dutch Bros became a publicly traded company, selling 21 million shares for a total of $484 million.

See also

References

External links 

 

coffeehouses and cafés in the United States
food and drink companies based in Oregon
companies based in Grants Pass, Oregon
American companies established in 1992
restaurants established in 1992
companies listed on the New York Stock Exchange
1992 establishments in Oregon
2021 initial public offerings